Carolles is a commune in the Manche department in Normandy in north-western France.

Heraldry

See also
Communes of the Manche department

References

External links

Local legends and history of Carolles, the Valley of the Painters and the Lude.

Communes of Manche